Blade Warrior is a beat 'em up video game, released in 1991 by Image Works for Amiga, Atari ST, and MS-DOS. The game was created by Jason Kingsley.

Gameplay
The game is a mix of adventuring and battling, in which players are tasked with collecting magical items and exploring the landscape of the game via the in-game map while fighting off enemies. Various facilities in the game are accessible only when a certain number of artifacts have been collected. A notable feature of Blade Warrior is the graphical interface: all objects in the game are seen in silhouette, except for obtainable items, and the effects of magic spells. The background is made up of a night sky, with clouds and hills, etc.

Plot
The world has been enslaved by Murk, and players are challenged to free it by collecting the seven fragments of a tablet which are in the possession of seven wizards who inhabit seven towers.

Reception

References

External links 
 Blade Warrior at the HOL Amiga Database

1991 video games
Amiga games
Atari ST games
DOS games
Fantasy video games
Image Works games
Monochrome video games
Single-player video games
Video games developed in the United Kingdom
Video_games_with_silhouette_graphics